Garry Ward is a former professional rugby league footballer who played in the 1980s. He played at club level for the Featherstone Rovers (Heritage № 575).

Club career
Garry Ward made his début for the Featherstone Rovers on Wednesday 28 April 1982.

References

Featherstone Rovers players
Place of birth missing
English rugby league players
Year of birth missing